This is the discography of Welsh folk singer-songwriter Mary Hopkin.

Albums

Studio albums

Live albums

Compilation albums

Other albums

EPs

Singles

Contributions

Notes

References

External Links
 

Discographies of British artists
Folk music discographies
Pop music discographies